The Crédit Commercial de France (CCF, "Commercial Credit [Company] of France") is a commercial bank in France, founded in 1894 as the Banque Suisse et Française and renamed to CCF in 1917. By the end of the 1920s, it had grown to be the sixth largest bank in France. Its brand was eclipsed between 2005 and 2022 under HSBC ownership, but is set to be revived by the bank's new owner Cerberus Capital Management.

History

Banque Suisse et Française

They had previously worked together for the Swiss , whose Paris branch formed the initial core of the new venture. Méjà remained as joint managing director of the bank with Rossier until his death in 1910. Rossier then continued to run the bank until his retirement in 1936. 

From its early days, the BSF took an active interest in commerce and industry. A successful working relationship was developed with the Paris department store Galeries Lafayette. The bank also helped fund the construction of the new Paris Métro and the installation of public lighting in the capital. The early success of the business led to considerable expansion. The number of employees rose tenfold by the turn of the century. From 1912, the bank began to develop a branch network, with 14 offices opening in Paris and a first provincial office in Lille. An office was also acquired in Marseille when the business of that city's  was taken over in 1914.

Crédit Commercial de France

Aynard had started out as a drapers’ company in the early 18th century, before turning to banking in 1858. Established in 1865, Caisse de Crédit de Nice had opened a number of branches along the French Riviera and in Italy. The merged entity adopted the name . It went on to purchase other banks and, by the end of the 1920s, had become the sixth largest bank in France.

In the 1960s, during the chairmanship of Jacques Merlin, CCF embarked upon a policy of further expansion, with the number of branches rising to more than 200. The bank's industrial affairs department and international department were also founded during this period. In 1979, it launched a long-running advertising campaign under the motto "The Bank of success", which boosted the number of shareholders from 17,000 to 34,000. 

In 1982, the CCF was nationalised by the French government. In 1987, following a change of political majority, the CCF was privatised again. CCF also acquired  in the 1980s. By the end of the 20th century, CCF was operating with 650 branches and assets of €69 billion.

Integration into HSBC

In April 2000, HSBC announced its intention to acquire the CCF and the transaction was completed in July. That month, HSBC Holdings plc was listed on the Paris Stock Exchange for the first time.

Brand revival under new ownership

In June 2021, private equity investors Cerberus Capital Management announced their plan to acquire HSBC Continental Europe's French retail operations together with the CCF brand, and merge them with their existing French bank , aiming to "build on CCF's legacy and re-establish the brand as a leading franchise for wealth management customers in France."

Leadership

The following individuals were Chair (or Chair & CEO) of the BSF, then CCF until absorption by HSBC: 
 Alexandre Halet: 1894-1902
 Théodore Faverger: 1902-1904
 Adolphe Salles: 1904-1924
 Maurice Koechlin: 1925-1926
 Georges Siegfried: 1926-1940
 Jean Davillier: 1940-1941
 Georges Painvin: 1941-1944
 Jean Davillier: 1944-1958
 Raymond Merckling: 1958-1960
 Jacques Merlin: 1961-1976
 : 1976-1982
 Guy Raoul-Duval: 1982
 Daniel Deguen: 1982-1984
 Claude Jouven: 1984-1985
 : 1985-1987
 Michel Pébereau: 1987-1993
 Charles de Croisset: 1993-2004
 : 2004-2005

Paris head office

The BSF started activity in rented offices at 27, rue Laffitte, in a new (1891) building on the former location of Jacques Laffitte's mansion, next door to the Paris head office of the Rothschild family bank at numbers 19-25.

In 1922, the CCF moved its head office to the prominent building at 103, Champs-Elysées, previously the  designed by architect , built by the Compagnie Internationale des Grands Hotels and opened on  ahead of the Exposition Universelle of 1900. The luxury hotel had closed in the financial turmoil following World War I. The CCF, then HSBC France stayed there until 2020. It was then announced that the property, owned by Qatar since 2010, would be repurposed to become the Parisian flagship store of Christian Dior.

See also
 Banque nationale pour le commerce et l'industrie
 Société Générale

References

Notes

External links

 

HSBC acquisitions
Banks established in 1858
Banks disestablished in 2000
1894 establishments in France
Banks of France